Jason Aliston Rogers (born 31 August 1991 in Sandy Point) is a Saint Kitts and Nevis sprinter who specialises in the 100 metres.

Rogers helped win a bronze medal as a part of the 4 × 100 m relay at the 2008 Central American and Caribbean Championships in Cali, Colombia. He also finished sixth in the 100 metres final of the 2010 World Junior Championships in Moncton, Canada.  He has competed in three Olympic Games for his country (2012, 2016 and 2020).  At the 2020 Olympics, he was the flagbearer for Saint Kitts and Nevis.  He has also competed at the 2010, 2014 and 2018 Commonwealth Games, and the 2011 and 2013 World Championships.

Personal bests

International competitions

1Disqualified in the final

References

External links

Tilastopaja biography

1991 births
Living people
Pan American Games silver medalists for Saint Kitts and Nevis
Pan American Games medalists in athletics (track and field)
Athletes (track and field) at the 2011 Pan American Games
Athletes (track and field) at the 2015 Pan American Games
Athletes (track and field) at the 2019 Pan American Games
Saint Kitts and Nevis male sprinters
Olympic athletes of Saint Kitts and Nevis
Athletes (track and field) at the 2012 Summer Olympics
Athletes (track and field) at the 2016 Summer Olympics
Athletes (track and field) at the 2020 Summer Olympics
World Athletics Championships medalists
Athletes (track and field) at the 2010 Commonwealth Games
Athletes (track and field) at the 2014 Commonwealth Games
Athletes (track and field) at the 2018 Commonwealth Games
Commonwealth Games competitors for Saint Kitts and Nevis
Central American and Caribbean Games medalists in athletics
Competitors at the 2018 Central American and Caribbean Games
Medalists at the 2011 Pan American Games